Way Down South is a 1939 American musical film directed by Leslie Goodwins and Bernard Vorhaus, and produced by Sol Lesser. It was written by Clarence Muse, who also acted in the film, and Langston Hughes. Victor Young was nominated for the Academy Award for Best Music, Scoring.

Plot
In antebellum Louisiana in 1854, young orphan Timothy Reid Jr. inherits a plantation and its slaves. However, lawyer Martin Dill is made the executor of the estate. Dill plots to sell the slaves and flee to Paris with the proceeds. Timothy is befriended by Jacques Bouton, who persuades Judge Louis Ravenal to look into the matter and save the day.

Cast
Bobby Breen as Timothy Reid Jr.
Alan Mowbray as Jacques Bouton
Ralph Morgan as Timothy Reid Sr.
Steffi Duna as Pauline Dubini
Clarence Muse as Uncle Caton
Sally Blane as Claire Bouton
Edwin Maxwell as Martin Dill
Charles Middleton as Cass
Robert Greig as Judge Louis Ravenal
Lillian Yarbo as Janie
Matthew Beard as Gumbo 
Hall Johnson Choir as Musical Ensemble
Willie Best as Chimney Sweep (uncredited)
Blue Washington as Slave (uncredited)

References

External links 

1939 films
1930s crime films
American crime films
American historical musical films
American black-and-white films
Films about orphans
Works by Langston Hughes
1930s historical musical films
Films produced by Sol Lesser
Films scored by Victor Young
Films set in the 1850s
Films set in Louisiana
1930s English-language films
Films directed by Bernard Vorhaus
Films directed by Leslie Goodwins
1930s American films